The Railroad Camp Shanty in De Smet, South Dakota, United States, was built by the Chicago and Northwestern Railway (C&NW) in 1878 to shelter railroad personnel. The Railroad Shanty is a simple frame building measuring roughly 10' by 22' and covered with horizontal siding. Presumably in the 1880's or early 1890's the building was moved three blocks from its original location and was placed on a cement block foundation.

It was converted into a home by the Ingalls family during the winter of 1879-80. The family's experiences in the shanty were the subject of Wilder's By the Shores of Silver Lake, one of her most popular works. In 1967, the building was purchased by the Laura Ingalls Wilder Memorial Society, Inc., a local group, and now serves as a museum.

The railroad shanty was placed on the National Register of Historic Places because of its association with Laura Ingalls Wilder and railroad development in South Dakota.

References
Dannonbring, Leslie. Railroad Camp Shanty (Kingsbury County, South Dakota) National Register of Historic Places Registration Form, 1972. On file at the National Park Service.

Chicago and North Western Railway
Railway buildings and structures in South Dakota
National Register of Historic Places in Kingsbury County, South Dakota
Railway buildings and structures on the National Register of Historic Places in South Dakota
1878 establishments in Dakota Territory